Vara Vikrayam (English: Precious Sale) is a 1939 Telugu drama film directed by C. Pullayya. The film is a reformist social film about the dowry system prevalent in British India. It is based on the novel and play of the same name by Kallakoori Narayana Rao. It is the debut film for Bhanumathi.

Plot
The retired government official Purshottama Rao (Daita Gopalam) borrows money to get his eldest daughter Kalindi (Bhanumathi) married to an old-man Lingaraju (Balijepalli). He is a money lender and already married twice. Kalindi does not like this marriage and commits suicide before the marriage can take place. Lingaraju refuses to return the dowry money. Purshottama's second daughter Kamala (Pushpavalli) agrees to marry him. She drags her husband Lingaraju to court of justice.

Cast

References

External links
 

1939 films
1930s Telugu-language films
Indian black-and-white films
Indian films based on plays
Indian drama films
Films based on Indian novels
1939 drama films
Films directed by C. Pullayya
Films scored by Prabhala Satyanarayana